The 2009–10 Deutsche Eishockey Liga season is the 16th season since the founding of the Deutsche Eishockey Liga. Prior to the season, the Füchse Duisburg voluntarily left the league due to financial hardship. Bietigheim Steelers, champions of the 2. Bundesliga had an opportunity to join the league, but canceled their licensing application.

A change from the previous season was the renaming of the Sinupret Ice Tigers, who are playing under the new name Thomas Sabo Ice Tigers. During the previous season it became obvious that the Ice Tigers were in a dire financial situation. On 25 November 2008 preliminary insolvency was filed and, on 30 December 2008, declared. This led to the corporate sponsor Bionorica pulling their support in March 2009. An investor group led by local jeweler Thomas Sabo intervened on 3 April 2009, pre-empting bankruptcy proceedings and ensuring participation in the 2009–10 season.

Teams

Regular season

GP = Games Played, W = Wins, OTW = Overtime win, SOW = Shootout win, OTL = Overtime loss, SOL = Shootout loss, L = Loss
Color code:  = Direct Playoff qualification,  = Playoff qualification round,  = No playoff

Source: DEL.org

Source: DEL.org

Playoffs

Qualification

Bracket

Quarterfinals

Semifinals

Final

References

1
2009–10 in European ice hockey leagues
2009-10